The 2021–22 Combined Counties Football League season (known as the 2021–22 Cherry Red Records Combined Counties Football League for sponsorship reasons) was the 44th in the history of the Combined Counties Football League, a football competition in England. Teams were divided for the first time into three divisions: the Premier North, the Premier South and the First.

The constitution was announced on 18 May 2021.

After the abandonment of the 2019–20 and 2020–21 seasons due to the COVID-19 pandemic, a number of promotions were decided on a points per game basis over the previous two seasons.

Premier Division North
The new Premier Division North consists of 18 clubs. Seven of these participated in the old Premier Division last season, and were joined by 11 new clubs:
Four transferred from the Hellenic League Premier Division:
Burnham
Reading City
Virginia Water
Windsor
Three transferred from the Spartan South Midlands League Premier Division:
Edgware Town
North Greenford United
Wembley
One transferred from the Wessex League Premier Division:
Tadley Calleva
Two promoted from the Hellenic League Division One East:
Holyport
Wokingham & Emmbrook
One promoted from the Spartan South Midlands League Division One:
St Panteleimon

League table
<onlyinclude>

Stadia and locations

Premier Division South
The new Premier Division South consists of 20 clubs. Twelve of these participated in the old Premier Division last season, and were joined by eight new clubs:
Three transferred from the Southern Counties East League Premier Division:
AFC Croydon Athletic
Balham
Beckenham Town
One transferred from the Southern Combination League Premier Division:
Horley Town 
One transferred from the Wessex League Premier Division:
Fleet Town
Three promoted from the Combined Counties League Division One:
Farnham Town
Jersey Bulls
Walton & Hersham

League table
<onlyinclude>

Stadia and locations

Division One
Division One was increased from 20 to 21 clubs after Farnham Town, Jersey Bulls and Walton & Hersham were promoted to the Premier Division South; Dorking Wanderers Reserves, Epsom & Ewell and Godalming Town were transferred to the Southern Combination; Chessington & Hook United, Tooting Bec and Westside were transferred to the Southern Counties East League; and Ash United and Fleet Spurs were transferred to the Wessex League. The remaining nine clubs were joined by twelve new clubs:
Five transferred from the Hellenic League Division One East:
A.F.C. Aldermaston
Chalvey Sports
Langley
Wallingford Town (after appeal)
Woodley United
Four transferred from the Spartan South Midlands League Division One:
Enfield Borough
Hillingdon Borough
London Lions
Rayners Lane
Two promoted from the Middlesex County League:
Hilltop
London Samurai Rovers
One promoted from the Thames Valley Premier League:
Berks County

League table
<onlyinclude>

Promotion playoffs

Stadia and locations

References

External links
 Combined Counties League Official Site

2021-22
9